Predrag Rajković (born 31 October 1995) is a Serbian professional footballer who plays as a goalkeeper for La Liga club Mallorca and the Serbia national team.

Club career

Jagodina
Born in Negotin, he started training when he was 7 years old with his father Saša, who is also a former goalkeeper of Hajduk Veljko. He was with his hometown club until 2009, when he moved to Jagodina. For next 4 years, he played for youth teams of Jagodina, and was with first team since 2011–12 season, and was licensed with jersey number 45. Next season, Bondžulić changed his squad number to 11 again, so Rajković took 1. Although Bondžulić was the first choice, Rajković mainly was his reserve in front of competitors Petar Jokić and Stevica Zdravković. He made his professional debut for Jagodina on 9 March 2013 in a Serbian SuperLiga match versus Partizan. Until the end of 2012–13 season, he made one more match against Smederevo. After Bondžulić's departure, Anđelko Đuričić joined Jagodina. After first fixture and lose against Napredak Kruševac, Mladen Dodić decided to give Rajković a chance, because of his merits in winning 2013 UEFA European Under-19 Championship. But, after 2 appearances in new season, Rajković left to Red Star Belgrade. Jagodina should receive 30 percent of his next transfer.

Red Star Belgrade

2013–14 season
He signed a four-year contract with Red Star Belgrade on 28 August 2013, and took the jersey number 95, according to year of his birth. He acted as a backup to Boban Bajković, and fought for a place on the bench with Miloš Vesić. He made his official debut for Red Star in last fixture against Vojvodina.

2014–15 season
After Bajković's and Vesić's departures, Rajković stayed with a year younger Filip Manojlović and Marko Trkulja who returned from Spartak Subotica, where he was on loan. Club management decided to sign a more experienced goalkeeper, and Damir Kahriman joined Red Star. But Kahriman couldn't play at the beginning of the season because of administrative problems, so Rajković started the season as a first choice. After Milijaš's departure, Mijailović's suspension, Luković's injury, and Lazović's conflict with management, coach Nenad Lalatović decided to give the captain's armband to Rajković. He had 16 clean sheets in 28 league appearances, and was selected as the best goalkeeper in 2014–15 season, chosen by other players.

2015–16 season
On 29 June 2015, Rajković signed a new three-year contract with Red Star, after days of speculation about his potential transfer away from the club. After winning 2015 FIFA U-20 World Cup in New Zealand and the award for the best goalkeeper of the tournament, many European clubs wanted Rajković, including French Ligue 1 club Lyon, Belgian side Club Brugge and according to some reports Italian giant Serie A club A.C. Milan. The Crvena zvezda captain was also a top target for Paris Saint Germain along with Kevin Trapp, who signed for Les Parisiens at the end. Rajković was the best member in team during both matches against Kairat in the first qualifying round of the Europa League. Rajković kept the team from suffering a deeper loss with some incredible saves. The coach of Kairat, Vladimír Weiss, said after the game that Rajković is one of the best goalkeepers in Europe. After great saves in first rounds of the Serbian SuperLiga, despite Zvezda's poor start, Turkish champion Galatasaray declared interest in him.

Predrag Rajković was one of the contestants at 2018 FIFA World Cup qualifying draw, which took place at the Konstantinovsky Palace in Strelna, Saint Petersburg on 25 July 2015.

Maccabi Tel Aviv

On 29 August 2015, Rajković signed a five-year contract with Maccabi Tel Aviv. The transfer fee was €3 million. On 30 August, Rajković made his Israeli Premier League debut in a 1–0 victory over Hapoel Be'er Sheva during the second league match of the season. Rajković made 43 appearances in all competitions, including Israeli Premier League, State Cup, Toto Cup in which he did not play and UEFA Champions League. He noted 21 clean sheets at total until the end of 2015–16 season. Rajković also continued playing as the first choice goalkeeper in the 2016–17 Israeli Premier League season. During the first half-season, he also made 14 appearances in the UEFA Europa League, which the club ended at third place in group stage. Rajković made an assist to Viðar Örn Kjartansson in the State Cup match against Hapoel Bnei Lod played on 7 January 2017, saving a shot from the opponent's previous attack. In May same year, Rajković was elected for the club's player of the season in an inner club event. On 14 December 2017, Rajković won the Toto Cup trophy with Maccabi, beating Hapoel Be'er Sheva in final match of the competition.

Reims 
On 23 July 2019, Rajković signed a four-year contract with Stade de Reims. The transfer fee was €3 million. Rajkovic was brought in for the outgoing Edouard Mendy, who was on his way to Stade Rennais after a summer of heavy speculation on his future. Mendy had been hugely impressive in his first season in Ligue 1, keeping 14 clean sheets bettered only by Lyon's Anthony Lopes and Nice's Walter Benitez. In his first season in the Champagne region, Rajković will have youth academy product Nicolas Lemaitre as a backup. Rajković made his debut on 10 August 2019 in a 2–0 away win against Marseille.

Mallorca 

On 22 July 2022, Rajković signed for La Liga club Mallorca on a four-year contract. The transfer fee paid to Reims was of €4.5 million, with a sell-on clause included in the deal as well.

International career

Youth
Rajković was a member of the Serbia U-16 and Serbia U-17 national teams. Rajković was one of the most deserving players for winning the 2013 UEFA European Under-19 Championship, when he saved goal many times with great interventions and stopped penalties. Next year, he also was one of the best, but Serbia lost against Portugal in the semi-final after penalties. Rajković lead the team in the 2015 FIFA U-20 World Cup with the captain's armband. After group stage and first place, Serbia beat Hungary after extra time. In the quarter-final, Rajković saved 2 penalties and missed one in a penalty shootout against the USA. After Maksimović's goal, Serbia advanced to the next round. In the final, Rajković was one of the most important men on the field, keeping the result with incredible saves. The captain of Serbia national under-20 football team won the nomination for the best goalkeeper in the competition. Radovan Ćurčić, coach of Serbia U-21, called him for a friendly match against Israel, played on 6 February 2013.

Senior
Rajković was called in Serbia national team under coach Siniša Mihajlović. He debuted for the senior team on 7 August 2013 against Colombia.

In June 2018 he was selected in Serbia’s squad for the 2018 World Cup, but he did not make any appearances there as he was backup to Vladimir Stojković.

In November 2022, he was selected in Serbia's squad for the 2022 FIFA World Cup in Qatar, but he didn't make any appearance there, as Vanja Milinković-Savić was the first-choice goalkeeper.

Personal life
On 8 August 2018, Rajković married his Serbian girlfriend Ana Cakić. Predrag picked his teammate from Serbian national team, Saša Zdjelar, for his best man on the wedding. They have two sons together.

Career statistics

Club

International

Honours
Jagodina
Serbian Cup: 2012–13

Red Star Belgrade
Serbian SuperLiga: 2013–14 

Maccabi Tel Aviv
 Israeli Premier League: 2018–19
Toto Cup: 2017–18, 2018–19

Serbia
UEFA European U-19 Championship: 2013
FIFA U-20 World Cup: 2015

Individual
The Best Young Athlete of Serbia: 2013
UEFA European Under-19 Championship Team of the Tournament: 2013
FIFA U-20 World Cup Golden Glove: 2015
 Serbian SuperLiga Team of the Season: 2014–15

References

External links

 Profile at the RCD Mallorca website
 
 Predrag Rajković stats at utakmica.rs 
 
 
 
 
 

1995 births
Living people
People from Negotin
Serbian footballers
Association football goalkeepers
Serbia youth international footballers
Serbia under-21 international footballers
Serbia international footballers
FK Jagodina players
Red Star Belgrade footballers
Maccabi Tel Aviv F.C. players
Stade de Reims players
RCD Mallorca players
Serbian SuperLiga players
Israeli Premier League players
Ligue 1 players
La Liga players
Serbian expatriate footballers
Expatriate footballers in Israel
Serbian expatriate sportspeople in Israel 
Expatriate footballers in France
Serbian expatriate sportspeople in France 
Expatriate footballers in Spain
Serbian expatriate sportspeople in Spain 
2018 FIFA World Cup players
2022 FIFA World Cup players